Microsoft Egypt is a division of Microsoft which markets Microsoft products in Egypt.

History
Microsoft established a branch in Egypt in 1995 as an office representative, becoming a limited liability company in 1997.

CMIC
Microsoft launched the Cairo Microsoft Innovation Center in September 2007. It is located in the Smart Village near Cairo. Its mission is to work on concept-level research problems that are relatively short to market. It is headed by Tarek El-Abbadi, a long time Program Manager at the Microsoft Redmond office.

References

External links 
 
 Advanced Technology Lab Cairo

Microsoft local divisions
Cloud computing providers
Software companies of Egypt